Vervoort is a Dutch toponymic surname. It is a contraction of the name Van der Voort, meaning "from the ford" (fordable place).  Notable people with the surname include:
 Ann Vervoort (1977–2010), Belgian dancer and graphic designer
 David Vervoort (born 1977), Belgian record producer and musician
 Désiré Vervoort (1810–1886), Belgian lawyer and politician
 Jonathan Vervoort (born 1993), Belgian footballer
 Marieke Vervoort (1979–2019), Belgian athlete at the Paralympic Games 
 Patrick Vervoort (born 1965), Belgian footballer
 Rudi Vervoort (born 1958), Belgian politician, Minister-President of the Brussels-Capital Region

Dutch-language surnames